Jingzhou railway station is a railway station located in Jingzhou District, Jingzhou, Hubei Province, People's Republic of China, on the Hanyi Railway which operated by China Railway Wuhan Group. It is located in Yingcheng Town of Jingzhou District, some 3 km north of Jingzhou's central business district.

Service
Frequent D-series trains on the Yichang–Wuhan route; some trains continue east to Shanghai.

There is no freight service at the Jingzhou railway station, and none is planned. Instead, rail freight destined for Jingzhou is handled at the local stations of the Jingmen–Shashi railway.

History
The station was opened on July 1, 2012, together with the new Wuhan–Yichang Railway. Although the station was physically close to Jingzhou's central urban area, passengers  found it  inconvenient due to the absence of a direct road connection. However, the new road is under construction, and is to open by the end of November 2012.

Nearby stations
Jingzhou also has several freight stations on the Jingmen–Shashi railway.

Notes

Railway stations in Hubei
Railway stations in China opened in 2012